Jiaxi is a town in Lufeng, Guangdong province, China. , it had 22 villages under its administration.

See also 
 List of township-level divisions of Guangdong

References 

Township-level divisions of Guangdong
Lufeng